The 2018–19 Kentucky Wildcats women's basketball team represents the University of Kentucky in the 2018–19 NCAA Division I women's basketball season. The team plays its home games in Lexington, Kentucky at Memorial Coliseum with two home games being played at Rupp Arena. The team is led by Matthew Mitchell in his twelfth season as head coach. They were a member of the Southeastern Conference. They finished the season 25–8, 11–5 in SEC play to finish in fourth place. They lost in the quarterfinals of the SEC women's tournament to Missouri. They received an at-large to the NCAA women's tournament where they defeated Princeton in the first round before losing to NC State in the second round.

The 2018–19 season opened up with a 10-day trip to Italy, where the team won two out of three games against international competition. The non-conference regular season also featured a trip to the U.S. Virgin Islands, where the team participated in and won the Paradise Jam tournament.

Previous season 
The 2017–18 team finished the season 15-17, 6-10 for ninth place in SEC play. They defeated Alabama in the second round of the SEC Tournament before losing to the #1 seed Mississippi State in the quarterfinals. The Wildcats failed to make a postseason appearance for the first time in eight seasons.

Offseason

Departures

Incoming Transfers

Newcomers

Roster

Schedule 

|-
!colspan=9 style=| Exhibition

|-
!colspan=9 style=| Non-conference regular season

|-
!colspan=9 style=| SEC regular season

|-
!colspan=9 style=| SEC Women's tournament

|-
!colspan=9 style=| NCAA Women's tournament

Rankings

See also 
 2018–19 Kentucky Wildcats men's basketball team

References 



Kentucky
Kentucky Wild
Kentucky Wildcats women's basketball seasons
University of Kentucky
Kentucky Wild
Kentucky